Full frame may refer to:

 35mm format
 Full frame (cinematography)
 Full-frame type charge-coupled device (CCD) image sensor

See also 
 Full-frame digital SLR
 Full-frame mirrorless interchangeable-lens camera